Omar Assar (born 22 July 1991 in Desouk) is an Egyptian table tennis player. He won silver in singles and gold in team play at the 2011 Arab Games in Doha.  He also competed at the 2012 and 2016 Summer Olympics in the Men's singles, but was defeated in the second round on both occasions.

Career
2012 Olympics

At the 2012 Summer Olympics Assar competed in the men's singles, where he lost in the second round to Panagiotis Gionis, and the men's team event, where Egypt lost in the first round to Austria.

2016 Olympics

At the 2016 Summer Olympics Assar competed in the men's singles only.  He lost in the second round again, this time narrowly losing 3–4 to Lei Kou of Ukraine.

ITTF World Championships 2017

Men's singles

Assar competed in the 2017 World Table Tennis Championships, seeded as number 50, facing off against Italian player Marco Rech in the first round, whom he defeated in a close match (4-3), having lost the first 3 sets. In the second round, he was defeated by Hong Kong player, and number 7 seed Wong Chun Ting (2-4).

Men's doubles

Assar teamed with fellow Egyptian player Mohamed El-Beiali for the doubles event, in which they were unseeded and faced the number 5 seed Brazilian of Hugo Calderano and Gustavo Tsuboi, losing the match (2-4).

"Mixed Doubles"

Assar teamed with fellow Egyptian player Dina Meshref for the mixed doubles event, seeded as number 12 team. They advanced to the third round of the tournament, before being eliminated by the Spanish team of Álvaro Robles and Galia Dvorak (1-4).

All-African Games

Assar won both the 2015 and 2016 All-African Games, Men's Singles. In 2017, his three-peat was interrupted by Nigerian table tennis player, Quadri Aruna, who defeated Assar in the tournament final (3-4).

2018 ITTF African-Cup

Assar defeated Tunisian table tennis player Thameur Mamia (4-1) in the quarterfinals of the event. He then defeated Saheed Idowu in the semifinal (4-0). Finally, Assar defeated long-time rival Quadri Aruna in the final of the event in order to win his third African-Cup.

2020 Olympics

At the 2020 Summer Olympics, Assar finished 5th in the men's singles event after losing to China's Ma Long in the quarterfinals. He also competed in the men's team event and the mixed doubles.

As of August 2021, Omar is ranked 36th in the world in the ITTF world rankings. He reached his highest ranking of 16th in March 2016.

References

External links
 

1991 births
Living people
Olympic table tennis players of Egypt
Table tennis players at the 2012 Summer Olympics
Table tennis players at the 2016 Summer Olympics
Table tennis players at the 2020 Summer Olympics
Mediterranean Games gold medalists for Egypt
Mediterranean Games silver medalists for Egypt
Mediterranean Games medalists in table tennis
Competitors at the 2013 Mediterranean Games
Competitors at the 2022 Mediterranean Games
African Games gold medalists for Egypt
African Games medalists in table tennis
African Games silver medalists for Egypt
African Games bronze medalists for Egypt
People from Desouk
Competitors at the 2011 All-Africa Games
Competitors at the 2015 African Games
Competitors at the 2019 African Games
21st-century Egyptian people